Ana Maria Miranda Paz is a Galician politician of the Galician Nationalist Bloc. She has served thrice in the European Parliament.

Career in the European Parliament

2009 European Parliament election
Miranda was on the list of the Europe of the Peoples–Greens electoral alliance in the 2009 European elections. The alliance won a single seat which was held first by Oriol Junqueras of ERC (Republican Left of Catalonia). Miranda joined the European Parliament in January 2012 after Junqueras stood down.  She served until 2013.

2014 European Parliament election
In the 2014 European elections, Miranda stood on the list of The Peoples Decide alliance. The alliance won a single seat which it was decided to allocate on a rotative basis to Ana Miranda and Josu Juaristi. The latter candidate, a member of EH Bildu, held the seat first.
Miranda took over the seat in February 2018, joining the parliamentary group of the Greens/European Free Alliance in March.

2019 European Parliament election
In the 2019 election the Galician nationalists were allied with the electoral coalition Ahora Repúblicas, which included ERC, EH Bildu and some other minor nationalist parties as well. The coalition obtained 3 seats, which will be held rotatively, with Ana Miranda set to hold a seat for the last 3.5 years of the Parliament.

She replaced Pernando Barrena in September 2022.

References

External links

1971 births
Living people
MEPs for Spain 2009–2014
MEPs for Spain 2014–2019
21st-century women MEPs for Spain
People from Caldas (comarca)
Galician Nationalist Bloc MEPs
Europe of the Peoples–Greens MEPs

MEPs for Spain 2019–2024